Philipp Jaffé (17 February 1819 – 3 April 1870) was a German historian and philologist. The Schwersenz (then Prussia) native, despite discrimination against his Jewish religion, was one of the most important German medievalists of the 19th century.

Biography and career
After graduating from the gymnasium at Posen in 1838 he went to Berlin, entering a banking-house. Two years later he abandoned commercial life and studied at Humboldt University of Berlin (Ph.D. 1844). Seven years later appeared his great work, Regesta Pontificum Romanorum ab Condita Ecclesia ad Annum p. Ch. n. 1198, containing 11,000 papal documents, (Berlin, 1851. 2nd ed. by Löwenfeld, Kaltenbrunner, and Ewald. Leipzig, 1885–88). This work made him well known, but he had still to earn a livelihood; he therefore again entered the university, this time as a student of medicine, at Berlin and later at Vienna. Graduating as M.D. from Berlin in 1853, he engaged in practise in that city for a year, and then became one of the editors of the Monumenta Germaniae Historica. This position he resigned in 1863, his chief work having been vols. xii, xvi, xvii, xviii, xix, and xx of the Scriptores.

In 1862 Jaffé was appointed assistant professor of history at Humboldt University of Berlin, where he lectured on Latin paleography and Roman and medieval chronology. In 1868 he became a Christian. During the last year of his life he suffered from delirium persecutionis.

Jaffé wrote, in addition to the above-mentioned works, Geschichte des Deutschen Reiches unter Lothar dem Sachsen, Berlin, 1843; Geschichte des Deutschen Reiches unter Konrad III. Hanover, 1845; and Bibliotheca Rerum Germanicarum, ib. 1864–1871. The latter series contained editions of the correspondence and vitae of Saint Boniface; his edition of the Boniface correspondence was praised as the first critical edition of the letters, and formed the basis for subsequent translations and editions of the letters, including that by Georg Pfahler. Jaffé furthermore collaborated with Wilhelm Wattenbach in editing the Ecclesiæ Metropolitanæ Coloniensis Codices, which was published (Berlin, 1879) by Wattenbach after Jaffé's death. Jaffé committed suicide at Wittenberge on 3 April 1870.

See also 
Jaffe family

References

1819 births
1870 deaths
1870s suicides
People from Swarzędz
19th-century German Jews
19th-century German historians
German philologists
Jewish historians
German medievalists
19th-century male writers